Posham Pa is a 2019 Indian Hindi-language psychological thriller film directed by Suman Mukhopadhyay. The film stars Mahie Gill, Sayani Gupta, Ragini Khanna in the main lead roles. The title generally refers to a children's rhyme but the film theme depicts the mass murder of children by serial killers. The plot of the film based on a real true story of serial killers Anjana, and her two daughters Seema Gavit and Renuka Shinde who kidnapped more than 40 children and murdered around 12 children on 19 November 1996. Seema and Renuka received death penalty in 2014 for committing the mass murder of 12 children while their mother Anjana died in 1997 while serving her punishment at prison. The film was released via the ZEE5 platform on 23 August 2019 and received generally positive reviews from the audience and critics.

Synopsis 
The story of a psychologically disturbed mother Prajakta (Mahie Gill) who inspired and coerced her two daughters into a life of crime Regha (Sayani Gupta) and Shikha (Ragini Khanna) who murdered 5 children and are arrested for committing such mass murder. The sisters Regha and Shikha later reveal everything related to the mass murder to two documentary filmmakers Gundeep (Imaad Shah) and Nikhat (Shivani Raghuvanshi).

Cast 

 Mahie Gill as Prajakta Deshpande
 Sayani Gupta as Regha Sathe
 Ragini Khanna as Shikha Deshpande
 Shivani Raghuvanshi as Nikhat Ismail
 Randheer Rai as Dharmesh Deshpande
 Imaad Shah as Gundeep Singh
 Nitanshi Goel as Regha Sathe's kid

Production 
The project was announced by ZEE5 in July 2019 during the post-production stage of the film. The film director chose all female cast for the film giving prominence to women characters. Mahie Gill was roped into play the role of a psychologically disturbed mother Prajakta resembling Anjana while Sayani Gupta and Ragini Khanna were roped into play the roles as sisters resembling the mass murderers Seema and Renuka. The film was predominantly shot in a prison in Matunga, Mumbai where the serial killers are currently staying.

References

External links 
 

2010s Hindi-language films
Indian psychological thriller films
ZEE5 original films
Films shot in Mumbai
Hindi-language films based on actual events
Indian films based on actual events
2019 direct-to-video films
2019 films
Serial killer films
Films about real serial killers
2010s serial killer films
Biographical films about serial killers